Rivière des Créoles is a village in southeastern Mauritius. It’s river flows southeast for 13 kilometres, reaching the Indian Ocean close to Mahébourg.

References

Creoles